Felix Würth (11 August 1923 – 25 February 2014) was an Austrian long and triple jumper who competed in the 1948 Summer Olympics and in the 1952 Summer Olympics.

Würth was married to Lotte Haidegger, a fellow Olympian. He died in Guelph, Ontario on 25 February 2014, at the age of 90.

References

1923 births
2014 deaths
Athletes (track and field) at the 1948 Summer Olympics
Athletes (track and field) at the 1952 Summer Olympics
Austrian male long jumpers
Austrian male triple jumpers
Olympic athletes of Austria